The 1930 Transylvania Pioneers football team represented Transylvania University as a member the Southern Intercollegiate Athletic Association (SIAA) during the 1930 college football season. Led by first-year head coach George E. Pyle, the Colonels compiled an overall record of 1–5–2, with a mark of 1–4–1 in conference play.

Schedule

References

Transylvania
Transylvania Pioneers football seasons
Transylvania Pioneers football